(Spanish) or  (Catalan) is a masculine given name of Latin origin (and so on). Already in the Middle Ages the name was being confused with the similar but distinct name Munio.

The meaning of the name is disputed. It could come from late Latin , meaning 'tutor', later 'monk'. The classicist Iiro Kajanto proposed a Celtic origin, since the name is mainly found in formerly Celtic-speaking parts of Spain.

People with the given name Nuño 
Nuño Rasura (9th century), one of two legendary judges of Castile
Nuño Fernández (fl. 920–27), count of Castile
Nuño I (bishop of Mondoñedo) (1025–1027), a medieval Galician bishop
Nuño Álvarez de Carazo (floruit 1028–1054), a Castilian nobleman, diplomat, and warrior
Nuño Alfonso (1112–1136), a medieval Galician bishop
Nuño Pérez de Lara (died 3 August 1177). a Castilian nobleman, politician and military leader
Nuño Sánchez (c. 1185 – 1242), a nobleman in the Crown of Aragon
Nuño González de Lara (died 1275), a Castilian nobleman, royal counsellor and military leader
Nuño González de Lara (died 1291), a Castilian nobleman and military leader of the House of Lara
Nuño González de Lara (died 1296), a Castilian noble of the House of Lara
Nuño de Guzmán (c. 1490 – 1558), a Spanish conquistador and colonial administrator in New Spain

People with the surname Nuño 

 Juan Antonio Gaya Nuño (1913–1976) was a Spanish art historian, author, teacher, and art critic.

See also 

Neno (name)
Nino (name)
Niño (name)
Nuno (disambiguation)
Nuño Álvarez (disambiguation)
Nuño González de Lara (disambiguation)
Nuño Gómez, a municipality located in the province of Toledo, Spain

Notes

Spanish masculine given names